The Grand Sophy is a Regency romance novel by Georgette Heyer. It was first published in 1950 by Heinemann in the UK and Putnam in the U.S. The story is set in 1816.

Title

The Sophy or The Grand Sophy was a Western exonym for the Safavid ruler of Iran. "Sophy" was a corruption or mishearing of the dynasty name "Safavi". In this book the heroine is jocularly called the Grand Sophy on a few occasions, but there is no Iranian connection or reference.

Plot summary
For the past several years Sophia Stanton-Lacy (known as Sophy to everyone) has lived away from England, following her diplomat father Sir Horace around Europe while the Napoleonic Wars raged on.  Now that the Battle of Waterloo is over and Napoleon has once again been exiled, her father receives a temporary post in South America. Instead of taking his daughter with him to the new continent, he asks his sister, Lady Ombersley, to watch over his "little Sophy" and help find her a husband.  However, "little Sophy" is nothing like anyone expected.  5'9" in her stockings and quite used to getting her own way after a lifetime in a household with no mother, no governess, and wartime liberties, she is outgoing, chic, and quite independent, taking the town by storm with her unconventional manner.

Though most of her cousins take to her on sight, her autocratic cousin, Charles Rivenhall, is immediately frustrated and annoyed. Having been raised with a passive, sickly mother and an intemperate, gambling addict father, Charles has assumed since a young age the role of the adult in the household.  Forced by his father's debt to shoulder the family finances, he resents the disruption by his lively and confident cousin of what has become, in all but name, his household. With Charles encouraged in domestic tyranny by his spiteful fiancée, Miss Eugenia Wraxton, Sophy and Charles begin a battle of wills. Soon after her arrival, Sophy realizes that all is not well in the Rivenhall household and proceeds to solve the various problems of the family with her trademark flair, saving her cousin Hubert from a moneylender, arranging through an involved and hilarious scheme her cousin Cecilia's extraction from her infatuation with (and later engagement to) a poet, and promoting her marriage to the eligible Lord Charlbury, the man favoured by her brother and parents and ultimately, the man Cecilia discovers she loves.

Slowly, much to the consternation of both, Sophy and Charles find themselves falling in love, with Sophy's devilry lightening his dictatorial tendencies. In the end, at the successful conclusion of her audacious scheme to unite Cecilia and Charlbury and free Rivenhall from his obligations to his fiancée, Rivenhall proposes, with Sophy accepting.

Characters
Sophia (Sophy) Stanton-Lacy - the eponymous heroine, 20.

Sir Horace Stanton-Lacy - a diplomat, father of Sophy.

Charles Rivenhall - hero, 26, heir to his great uncle’s fortune.

Elizabeth, Lady Ombersley - long-suffering mother to Charles and wife to Lord Ombersley.

Lord Ombersley - Charles' father, who spends most of his time at his club.

Miss Eugenia Wraxton - Charles' fiancée, daughter of Lord Brinklow, a viscount.

Lord Bromford

Sir Vincent Talgarth - a fortune hunting colonel and friend of Sophy

Goldhanger - A Jewish moneylender. The passage with Goldhanger is criticised as anti-semitic, and has been cut from some editions.

Cecilia Rivenhall  - Charles' sister, 18, a debutante.

Lord Charlbury - 30, succumbed to mumps while courting Cecilia.

Augustus Fawnhope - a handsome poet.

Hubert Rivenhall - Charles' 21-year-old brother, up at Oxford.

Amabel Rivenhall - a schoolroom miss, 10

Gertrude Rivenhall  - a schoolroom miss, 12

Selina Rivenhall  - a schoolroom miss, 16

Theodore Rivenhall - at Eton

Miss Adderbury - the Rivenhalls' governess

Alfred Wraxton - brother of Eugenia

Sancia - a Spanish Marquesa betrothed to Sir Horace

Dassett - The Rivenhalls' butler

Jacko - a pet monkey

Tina - Sophy's dog, an Italian greyhound, who inexplicably likes Charles Rivenhall

Salamanca - Sophy's horse, on which Sophy commits the solecism of riding at a gallop in the park

References

1950 British novels
Novels by Georgette Heyer
British historical novels
Fiction set in 1816
Novels set during the Napoleonic Wars
Heinemann (publisher) books
Novels set in the 1810s
Regency romance novels